Matthias Miersch (born 19 December 1968) is a German criminal defense lawyer and politician of the Social Democratic Party (SPD) who has been serving as Member of the German Parliament since 2005, representing the Hannover-Land II district. He focusses on environmental policy.

Since 2013, Miersch has been a member of the party's executive board under successive chairpersons Sigmar Gabriel (2013-2017), Martin Schulz (2017-2018), Andrea Nahles (2018-2019) and Rolf Mützenich (since 2019).

Early life and education
Born in Hannover, Miersch studied law at the Leibniz University Hannover and the German University of Administrative Sciences Speyer. From 1988 until 1995, he volunteered for the St. John Accident Assistance.

Political career
Miersch has been a member of the German Bundestag since the 2005 national elections. He has since been serving on the Committee on the Environment, Nature Conservation and Nuclear Safety. Between 2005 and 2009, he served on the Committee on Legal Affairs.

In addition, Miersch was a member of the Parliamentary Advisory Board for Sustainable Development (2006-2009) and the Parliamentary Commission on the Disposal of Radioactive Waste (2014-2016). In 2014, he joined the parliamentary body in charge of appointing judges to the Highest Courts of Justice, namely the Federal Court of Justice (BGH), the Federal Administrative Court (BVerwG), the Federal Fiscal Court (BFH), the Federal Labour Court (BAG), and the Federal Social Court (BSG).

In the negotiations to form a Grand Coalition of the Christian Democrats (CDU together with the Bavarian CSU) and the SPD following the 2013 federal elections, Miersch was part of the SPD delegation in the working group on the environment and agriculture, led by Katherina Reiche and Ute Vogt.

Within his parliamentary group, Miersch belongs to the Parliamentary Left, a left-wing movement. He served as spokesperson on environmental policy between 2009 and 2013. In 2015, he was elected to the parliamentary group's executive board under the leadership of chairman Thomas Oppermann. Since 2017, he has been the group's deputy chairman, under successive chairs Andrea Nahles (2017-2019) and Rolf Mützenich (since 2019).

In 2019, Miersch succeeded Stefan Schostok as chairman of the SPD in Hannover.

In the negotiations to form a so-called traffic light coalition of the SPD, the Green Party and the FDP following the 2021 federal elections, Miersch led his party's delegation in the working group on environmental policy; his co-chairs from the other parties are Oliver Krischer and Lukas Köhler.

Other activities
 Business Forum of the Social Democratic Party of Germany, Member of the Political Advisory Board (since 2018)
 Evangelical Church in Germany (EKD), Member of the Committee on Sustainable Development (since 2016)
 Deutsche Bundesstiftung Umwelt (DBU), Member of the Board of Trustees (since 2009)
 Bundesstiftung Magnus Hirschfeld, Substitute Member of the Board of Trustees (since 2009)
 spw – Zeitschrift für sozialistische Politik und Wirtschaft, Member of the Editorial Board
 Nature and Biodiversity Conservation Union (NABU), Member
 Young Men's Christian Association (YMCA), Member

Personal life
Miersch is married with his partner.

External links 

 Website Matthias Miersch in German

References 

1968 births
Living people
Members of the Bundestag for Lower Saxony
LGBT members of the Bundestag
Gay politicians
Members of the Bundestag 2021–2025
Members of the Bundestag 2017–2021
Members of the Bundestag 2013–2017
Members of the Bundestag 2009–2013
Members of the Bundestag 2005–2009
Members of the Bundestag for the Social Democratic Party of Germany